The 1999 Nova Scotia general election was held on July 27, 1999, to elect members of the 58th House of Assembly of the Province of Nova Scotia, Canada. The government was defeated on a money bill on June 18, and the Nova Scotia House of Assembly was dissolved by Lieutenant Governor James Kinley. It was won by the Progressive Conservative party, led by Dr. John Hamm. They received a majority of 30 seats compared to 11 seats by the NDP and 11 by the Liberals.

Campaign
The Halifax Daily News ran an article which asked each party leader personal questions,  including one about whether the candidate had ever been convicted of a criminal offence. NDP Leader Robert Chisholm said no in response, however, several days later it was revealed that Chisholm had a past criminal record for driving under the influence of alcohol when he was 19 years old. Chisholm claimed that he lied because he did not want his daughter to find out about his past.

Results

Results by party

Results by region

Retiring incumbents
Liberal
Laurie Montgomery, Annapolis
Ed Lorraine, Colchester North
Gerry Fogarty, Halifax Bedford Basin
Francene Cosman, Bedford-Fall River

Progressive Conservative
George Archibald, Kings North
George Moody, Kings West
John Leefe, Queens

Independent
Reeves Matheson, Cape Breton East

Nominated candidates
Legend
bold denotes party leader
† denotes an incumbent who is not running for re-election or was defeated in nomination contest

Valley

|-
|bgcolor=whitesmoke|Annapolis
|
|Stephen McNeil3,26535.22%
|
|Tom Clahane 1,70818.43%
||
|Frank Chipman4,02643.43%
|
|Paul Mann 2712.92%
|
|
||
|Laurie Montgomery †
|-
|bgcolor=whitesmoke|Clare
||
|Wayne Gaudet2,70543.76%
|
|Don Melanson 1,07817.44%
|
|Paul Comeau 2,35538.10%
|
|Anne Marie Boyer 430.70%
|
|
||
|Wayne Gaudet
|-
|bgcolor=whitesmoke|Digby—Annapolis
|
|Vivian O'Neil1,55024.09%
|
|Steve Downes 1,10517.17%
||
|Gordon Balser3,78058.74%
|
|
|
|
||
|Gordon Balser
|-
|bgcolor=whitesmoke|Hants West
|
|Joe Robertson2,01522.25%
|
|Dick Terfry 1,76419.48%
||
|Ron Russell 5,27658.27%
|
| 
|
|
||
|Ron Russell
|-
|bgcolor=whitesmoke|Kings North
|
|Peter Hill1,97522.42%
|
|Neil H. McNeil 2,51328.53%
||
|Mark Parent4,32149.05%
|
|
|
|
||
|George Archibald †
|-
|bgcolor=whitesmoke|Kings South
|
|Robbie Harrison3,21333.23%
|
|Mary DeWolfe 2,56726.55%
||
|David Morse 3,89040.23%
|
|
|
|
||
|Robbie Harrison
|-
|bgcolor=whitesmoke|Kings West
|
|Don Clarke2,34628.70%
|
|Jacquie DeMestral 1,62919.93%
||
|Jon Carey4,03349.34%
|
|Frances Adams 1662.03%
|
|
||
|George Moody†
|}

South Shore

|-
|bgcolor=whitesmoke|Argyle
|
|Karen Kravfe82015.55%
|
|Belinda Tucker 3436.51%
||
|Neil LeBlanc4,06077.01%
|
|Oscar Harris 490.93%
|
|
||
|Neil LeBlanc
|-
|bgcolor=whitesmoke|Chester—St. Margaret's
|
|Karen Willis Duerden1,97121.28%
|
|Hinrich Bitter-Suermann 3,09833.45%
||
|John Chataway 4,19345.27%
|
|
|
|
||
|Hinrich Bitter-Suermann
|-
|bgcolor=whitesmoke|Lunenburg
|
|Lila O'Connor2,34426.29%
|
|Marilyn B. Crook1,98222.23%
||
|Michael Baker4,59051.48%
|
|
|
|
||
|Michael Baker
|-
|bgcolor=whitesmoke|Lunenburg West
||
|Don Downe4,24845.46%
|
|Eric Hustvedt 1,84619.75%
|
|Jerry Swain3,25134.79%
|
|
|
|
||
|Don Downe
|-
|bgcolor=whitesmoke|Queens
|
|Eddie Whitty1,29620.77%
|
|John Wiles 1,49824.00%
||
|Kerry Morash 3,44755.23%
|
|
|
|
||
|John Leefe †
|-
|bgcolor=whitesmoke|Shelburne
|
|Clifford Huskilson3,20641.54%
|
|Dianne Nickerson 1,30616.92%
||
|Cecil O'Donnell 3,20641.54%
|
|
|
|
||
|Clifford Huskilson
|-
|bgcolor=whitesmoke|Yarmouth 
|
|Phil DeMille2,60528.21%
|
|John Deveau 3,07933.34%
||
|Richard Hurlburt 3,14134.02%
|
|Brian W. Hurlburt 4094.43%
|
|
||
|John Deveau
|}

Fundy-Northeast

|-
|bgcolor=whitesmoke|Colchester—Musquodoboit Valley
|
|Leo Stacey1,05212.97%
|
|Jim Harpell 1,59119.62%
||
|Brooke Taylor 5,46567.40%
|
|
|
|
||
|Brooke Taylor
|-
|bgcolor=whitesmoke|Colchester North
|
|John Davidson2,27427.03%
|
|Ralph Martin 2,41128.66%
||
|Bill Langille3,72844.31%
|
|
|
|
||
|Ed Lorraine †
|-
|bgcolor=whitesmoke|Cumberland North
|
|Kathy Langille1,59519.02%
|
|Doug Wilson 85610.21%
||
|Ernie Fage5,93670.78%
|
|
|
|
||
|Ernie Fage
|-
|bgcolor=whitesmoke|Cumberland South
|
|John Harrison1,00013.39%
|
|Scott McKee94112.60%
||
|Murray Scott5,52774.01%
|
|
|
|
||
|Murray Scott
|-
|bgcolor=whitesmoke|Hants East
|
|Sara Stewart2,15023.33%
||
|John MacDonell 3,98543.25%
|
|Reese Morash 3,07933.42%
|
|
|
|
||
|John MacDonell
|-
|bgcolor=whitesmoke|Truro—Bible Hill
|
|Matthew Graham1,61318.21%
|
|Ibel Scammell2,49928.21%
||
|Jamie Muir 4,74753.58%
|
|
|
|
||
|Jamie Muir
|}

Central Halifax

|-
|bgcolor=whitesmoke|Halifax Bedford Basin
|
|Jack Hardiman2,93527.74%
|
|Errol Gaum 2,94627.85%
||
|Mary Ann McGrath4,48942.43%
|
|Janice Lively 2091.98%
|
|
||
|Gerry Fogarty †
|-
|bgcolor=whitesmoke|Halifax Chebucto
|
|Royden Trainer2,28627.27%
||
|Howard Epstein 3,15937.69%
|
|Sean Phillips2,81133.54%
|
|Hilda M. Stevens 1261.50%
|
|
||
|Howard Epstein
|-
|bgcolor=whitesmoke|Halifax Citadel
|
|Ed Kinley2,75229.88%
|
|Peter Delefes2,95832.11%
||
|Jane Purves3,39236.83%
|
|Grace Patterson 520.56%
|
|Art Canning 570.62%
||
|Peter Delefes
|-
|bgcolor=whitesmoke|Halifax Fairview
|
|Greta Murtagh1,88824.15%
||
|Eileen O'Connell 3,61546.23%
|
|Narayana Swamy2,11727.08%
|
|Maria Alexandridis 1992.55%
|
|
||
|Eileen O'Connell
|-
|bgcolor=whitesmoke|Halifax Needham
|
|Mike Rogers1,97025.12%
||
|Maureen MacDonald 3,52544.95%
|
|Linda Carvery 2,18527.86%
|
|Scott Higgins 1622.07%
|
|
||
|Maureen MacDonald
|}

Suburban Halifax

|-
|bgcolor=whitesmoke|Bedford—Fall River
|
|Gerry St. Armand2,19719.17%
|
|Jane Earle 2,70023.55%
||
|Peter Christie6,56657.28%
|
|
|
|
||
|Francene Cosman †
|-
|bgcolor=whitesmoke|Halifax Atlantic
|
|David Melnick1,45816.53%
||
|Robert Chisholm 4,26648.37%
|
|Bruce Cooke 2,79431.68%
|
|Gerald Rodgers 2342.65%
|
|Golda M. Redden 680.77%
||
|Robert Chisholm
|-
|bgcolor=whitesmoke|Sackville—Beaver Bank
|
|Bill MacDonald2,27625.86%
|
|Rosemary Godin 2,95133.53%
||
|Barry Barnet3,57340.60%
|
|
|
|
||
|Rosemary Godin
|-
|bgcolor=whitesmoke|Sackville—Cobequid
|
|Kevin Perkins1,23514.59%
||
|John Holm 4,78756.57%
|
|Wade Marshall2,44028.83%
|
|
|
|
||
|John Holm
|-
|bgcolor=whitesmoke|Timberlea—Prospect
|
|Vicki Brown2,17123.34%
||
|Bill Estabrooks 4,35646.83%
|
|Ken Fralick 2,60027.95%
|
|Ken Bumstead 1741.87%
|
|
||
|Bill Estabrooks
|-
|}

Dartmouth/Cole Harbour/Eastern Shore

|-
|bgcolor=whitesmoke|Cole Harbour—Eastern Passage
|
|Colin MacEachern2,21623.39%
||
|Kevin Deveaux 3,72139.27%
|
|Nadune Cooper Mont3,53937.35%
|
|
|
|
||
|Kevin Deveaux
|-
|bgcolor=whitesmoke|Dartmouth—Cole Harbour 
|
|Peter Foy2,15025.79%
||
|Darrell Dexter 3,16437.95%
|
|Greg Frampton 2,75032.98%
|
|Rufus Peacock 2743.29%
|
|
||
|Darrell Dexter
|-
|bgcolor=whitesmoke|Dartmouth East
||
|Jim Smith 2,97537.39%
|
|Heather Henderson 2,27228.55%
|
|Terry Degen2,71034.06%
|
|
|
|
||
|Jim Smith
|-
|bgcolor=whitesmoke|Dartmouth North
|
|Frank Cameron1,74624.74%
||
|Jerry Pye 3,10544.01%
|
|Jane MacKay2,06029.20%
|
|Susan Livingstone 1452.05%
|
|
||
|Jerry Pye
|-
|bgcolor=whitesmoke|Dartmouth South
|
|Audrey Goodyer2,32225.83%
|
|Don Chard 3,01133.50%
||
|Tim Olive 3,65640.67%
|
|
|
|
||
|Don Chard
|-
|bgcolor=whitesmoke|Eastern Shore
|
|Keith Colwell2,69531.01%
|
|Mary-Alice Tzagarakis 1,97022.67%
||
|Bill Dooks3,63741.85%
|
|Jack Friis 3884.46%
|
|
||
|Keith Colwell
|-
|bgcolor=whitesmoke|Preston
|
|Wendell Thomas50913.38%
|
|Yvonne Atwell 1,49639.32%
||
|David Hendsbee1,80047.31%
|
|
|
|
||
|Yvonne Atwell
|}

Central Nova

|-
|bgcolor=whitesmoke|Antigonish 
|
|Hyland Fraser4,05839.18%
|
|Charlene Long 2,22921.52%
||
|Angus MacIsaac4,07039.30%
|
|
|
|
||
|Hyland Fraser
|-
|bgcolor=whitesmoke|Guysborough—Port Hawkesbury
|
|Ray White3,15140.19%
|
|Wendy Panagopoulos 1,26716.16%
||
|Ron Chisholm3,28541.90%
|
|
|
|
||
|Ray White
|-
|bgcolor=whitesmoke|Pictou Centre
|
|Marie Maxwell 1,17113.78%
|
|Jeff Callaghan 1,85021.76%
||
|John Hamm5,47964.46%
|
|
|
|
||
|John Hamm
|-
|bgcolor=whitesmoke|Pictou East
|
|Lynn MacDonald1,28515.76%
|
|Andy Thompson 2,38829.30%
||
|Jim DeWolfe4,47854.94%
|
|
|
|
||
|Jim DeWolfe
|-
|bgcolor=whitesmoke|Pictou West
|
|Paul Landry2,10925.47%
|
|Charlie Parker 2,95535.69%
||
|Muriel Baillie3,10237.46%
|
|D. Ed Berringer 1141.38%
|
|
||
|Charlie Parker
|}

Cape Breton

|-
|bgcolor=whitesmoke|Cape Breton Centre
|
|Susan Deruelle Marsh 2,98539.94%
||
|Frank Corbett 4,04254.09%
|
|John Morrissey4465.97%
|
|
|
|
||
|Frank Corbett
|-
|bgcolor=whitesmoke|Cape Breton East
|
|Dave Wilson3,70440.12%
|
|Cecil Saccary 3,69940.06%
|
|Brad Kerr 1,04311.30%
|
|
|
|Gerard Burke 7878.52%
||
|Reeves Matheson †
|-
|bgcolor=whitesmoke|Cape Breton North
||
|Russell MacLellan 4,22248.69%
|
|Archie MacKinnon 2,58729.83%
|
|Murray Johnston1,86321.48%
|
|
|
|
||
|Russell MacLellan
|-
|bgcolor=whitesmoke|Cape Breton Nova
||
|Paul MacEwan4,00453.44%
|
|Gordie Gosse 3,25343.42%
|
|Harold Dorrington2353.14%
|
|
|
|
||
|Paul MacEwan
|-
|bgcolor=whitesmoke|Cape Breton South
||
|Manning MacDonald5,35662.90%
|
|Elizabeth Cusack 2,45128.78%
|
|Leland Lewis7088.31%
|
|
|
|
||
|Manning MacDonald
|-
|bgcolor=whitesmoke|Cape Breton—The Lakes
||
|Brian Boudreau3,71543.70%
|
|Helen MacDonald3,61442.51%
|
|Ken Langley1,17313.80%
|
|
|
|
||
|Helen MacDonald
|-
|bgcolor=whitesmoke|Cape Breton West
||
|Russell MacKinnon5,09451.83%
|
|Brian Slaney 3,35934.18%
|
|Joe Boudreau1,37513.99%
|
|
|
|
||
|Russell MacKinnon
|-
|bgcolor=whitesmoke|Inverness
|
|Charlie MacDonald3,54939.27%
|
|Roy Yipp 1,61217.84%
||
|Rodney MacDonald 3,87642.89%
|
|
|
|
||
|Charlie MacDonald
|-
|bgcolor=whitesmoke|Richmond
||
|Michel Samson3,10547.01%
|
|Wilma Conrod 1,59524.15%
|
|Joseph MacPhee1,90528.84%
|
|
|
|
||
|Michel Samson
|-
|bgcolor=whitesmoke|Victoria
||
|Kennie MacAskill2,26349.46%
|
|Nancy MacKeigan 77216.87%
|
|Anna Curtis-Steele1,17425.66%
|
|
|
|Osborne Burke2295.01%Stemer MacLeod1372.99%
||
|Kennie MacAskill
|}

See also
List of Nova Scotia general elections
List of Nova Scotia political parties

References

External links
 Elections Nova Scotia
 Halifax Herald 1999 election website via Internet Archive.

1999
Nova Scotia general
General election
Nova Scotia general election